Saint Ceneu was an early bishop of Menevia (St Davids) in Wales.

He is said to have been the son of Corun ap Ceredig or Coel Hen. He established a church or monastic community (clas) at the site of the current settlement of Clydau which was long known as Llangeneu in his honour.

References

Medieval Welsh saints
Bishops of St Davids
History of Pembrokeshire
Medieval Welsh clergy